is a railway station on the Tobu Skytree Line in Adachi, Tokyo, Japan, operated by the private railway operator Tobu Railway.

Lines
Kosuge Station is served by the Tobu Skytree Line, and lies 8.2 km from the Tokyo terminus of the line at Asakusa.

Station layout
The station has one island platform serving two tracks, with additional tracks on either side for non-stop trains.

Adjacent stations

History
Kosuge Station opened on 1 October 1924.

References

External links

 Tobu station information 

Railway stations in Tokyo